Langenwerder is a small uninhabited island near the island Poel north of Gollwitz, a district of the municipality of Poel island.

It is approximately 800 metres long, 500 metres wide, and flat.

The island is a nature reserve, due to the birds that live there, and therefore access to the island is not usually allowed.

External links 
www.langenwerder.de Homepage of Langenwerder

German islands in the Baltic
Uninhabited islands of Germany
Bay of Wismar
Nature reserves in Mecklenburg-Western Pomerania
Islands of Mecklenburg-Western Pomerania